Imara Esteves Ribalta (born April 15, 1978) is a Cuban olympic beach volleyballer at the 2008 Summer Olympics. She is partnered with Milagros Crespo.

References

1978 births
Living people
Cuban beach volleyball players
Women's beach volleyball players
Beach volleyball players at the 2008 Summer Olympics
Olympic beach volleyball players of Cuba